The Hamilton Flying Wildcats were trying to defend their championship, but the St. Hyacinthe-Donnacona Navy team finished off a Cinderella season by returning the Grey Cup back to Montreal for the first time since 1931.

Canadian football news in 1944
The WIFU and the IRFU suspended operations for the duration of World War II.

In late August, the Winnipeg Rugby Club (aka Blue Bombers) suspended operations for the 1944 season. The team loaned its equipment to local high schools.

The Regina Roughriders disbanded in early October. Unlike the previous season, the 1944 Roughriders did not have servicemen available to the team. Regular practices were conducted but the team gave up on the season when they failed to recruit enough civilian men to field a team.

Regular season

Final regular season standings
Note: GP = Games Played, W = Wins, L = Losses, T = Ties, PF = Points For, PA = Points Against, Pts = Points

Western Interprovincial Football Union
NO LEAGUE PLAY

Interprovincial Rugby Football Union
NO LEAGUE PLAY

Bold text means that they have clinched the playoffs.

Navy and Armed Services playoffs

The Navy playoffs did not affect the Grey Cup playoffs.  The Grey Cup was played between the ORFU winners (Hamilton) and the QRFU winners (St. Hyacinthe-Donnacona Navy) despite the Toronto Navy team beating the QRFU champions.  The OSFL did not participate in the Grey Cup playoffs.

Manitoba Inter-Services Rugby League

Bombers won the total-point series by 26-12. The MISRL did not compete for the Grey Cup.

Ontario Rugby Football League playoffs

Hamilton will play the St. Hyacinthe-Donnacona Navy in the Grey Cup.

Grey Cup Championship
{| class="wikitable" valign="top"
! bgcolor="#DDDDDD" colspan="4" | November 25
32nd Annual Grey Cup Game: A.A.A. Grounds - Hamilton, Ontario
|-
|| St. Hyacinthe-Donnacona Navy 7 || Hamilton Flying Wildcats 6
|-
| align="center" colspan="4" | St. Hyacinthe-Donnacona Navy are the 1944 Grey Cup Champions
|-
|}

1944 Ontario Armed Services Football League All-StarsNOTE: During this time most players played both ways, so the All-Star selections do not distinguish between some offensive and defensive positions.QB  – LS Annis Stukus, Toronto Navy Bulldogs
HB  – LS Tom Waldon, Toronto Navy Bulldogs
HB  – LAC Ray Mullins, St. Thomas Hornets
DB  – LAC Doug Smylie, Hagersville RCAF Flying Tigers
E   – Sgt. Dick Groom, Hagersville RCAF Flying Tigers
E   – LS Al Upper, Toronto Navy Bulldogs
FW  – Sgt. Doug Pyzer, Camp Borden RCAF Hurricanes
C   – F/O Jake Gaudaur, Camp Borden RCAF Hurricanes
G   – LS Hank McMahon, Toronto Navy Bulldogs
G   – Cpl. Fred Lamoureaux, Hagersville RCAF Flying Tigers
T   – Flt. Lt. Mike Ozarko, Camp Borden RCAF Hurricanes
T   – F/O Al Langford, Hagersville RCAF Flying Tigers

1944 Canadian Football Awards
 Jeff Russel Memorial Trophy (IRFU MVP) – no award given due to World War II''
 Imperial Oil Trophy (ORFU MVP) - Joe Krol - Hamilton Wildcats

References

 
Canadian Football League seasons